Aayushmaan Chaturvedi (born 25 October 1994) is an Indian professional footballer who plays as an attacking midfielder for Spółdzielca Siedliszcze in the Polish V liga.

Early life
Born in New Delhi, Delhi, Aayushmaan started playing football in early school life. Aayushmaan's career began when he signed a professional contract with Mohun Bagan A.C. making his debut at the age of 19. He was also a part of 2015 ISL Domestic Draft for the second edition of Indian Super League.

Club career

India
Played for Mohun Bagan A.C. from 2014 to 2016 in the I-League, and next season shifted to Minerva Punjab FC in the 2015–16 I-League 2nd Division. Next season he played for Sudeva Moonlight F.C. in 2017–18 I-League 2nd Division. Chaturvedi joined Quartz S.C. for the 2018–19 season and also was runner-up in the tournament in his debut with the Club.

Poland
In April 2022, it was confirmed that Chaturvedi joined Polish club MLKS Włodawianka Włodawa. He appeared with the club in fifth division (IV liga).

Later in August 2022, he joined another Polish club Spółdzielca Siedliszcze, that competes in the V liga and based in Chełm district. He scored his first goal for the club on 21 August against Unia Rejowiec in their 4–1 defeat. Aayushmaan is top goal scorer for Spółdzielca in Autumn season of 2022 with 6 goals in 10 appearances.

Awards
In 2012, Aayushmaan won Scholarship for Brooke House Football Academy (Leicestershire, England).
I-League Winner with Mohun Bagan A.C. in 2014–15.

Honours
Mohun Bagan
I-League: 2014–15

See also
 List of Indian football players in foreign leagues
 List of people from Delhi

References

External links 

Living people
1994 births
Association football midfielders
Footballers from Delhi
I-League 2nd Division players
I-League players
India youth international footballers
Indian footballers
RoundGlass Punjab FC players
Mohun Bagan AC players
People from New Delhi
Sudeva Delhi FC players
George Telegraph S.C. players
Calcutta Football League players
Indian expatriate footballers